Audin is a surname. Notable people with the surname include:

Amable Audin (1899–1990), French archaeologist
Jean-M.-Vincent Audin (1793–1851), French Roman Catholic author, journalist and historian
Martine Audin (born 1959), French gymnast
Maurice Audin (1932–1957), French mathematician
Michèle Audin (born 1954), French mathematician, writer and a former professor
Nadine Audin (born 1958), French gymnast

See also 
FC Audin, is a football club of East Timor